Heilberscheid is an Ortsgemeinde – a community belonging to a Verbandsgemeinde – in the Westerwaldkreis in Rhineland-Palatinate, Germany.

Geography

The community lies in the Westerwald between Koblenz and Limburg an der Lahn in the Nassau Nature Park. The community belongs to the Verbandsgemeinde of Montabaur, a kind of collective municipality.

History
In 1362, Heilberscheid had its first documentary mention.

Politics

Community council
The council is made up of 12 council members who were elected in a majority vote in a municipal election on 7 June 2009.

Coat of arms
The community's arms show a Madonna in the middle in a grotto with a model of Heilberscheid's Marienkappelle (built 1889-1891). The hornbeam twigs refer to the widespread hornbeams that grow in the Heilberscheid Forest. The background tinctures, red and silver, are from the arms borne by the Electorate of Trier.

Economy and infrastructure

The nearest Autobahn interchange is Diez on the A 3 (Cologne–Frankfurt), some 5 km away.

References

External links
Heilberscheid in the collective municipality’s Web pages 

Municipalities in Rhineland-Palatinate
Westerwaldkreis